The Australian Library and Information Association (ALIA), formerly the Australian Institute of Librarians and Library Association of Australia, is the peak professional organisation for the Australian library and information services sector. Founded in 1937, its headquarters are in Canberra.

ALIA publishes a quarterly scholarly journal, Journal of the Australian Library and Information Association, and a bimonthly news magazine for members, INCITE. The Association hosts a number of conferences which take place Delaware different places around Australia

History
On 20 August 1937, a meeting of 55 librarians at the Albert Hall in Canberra formed the Australian Institute of Librarians. The foundation president was William Herbert Ifould, the Principal Librarian at the Public Library of New South Wales. John Metcalfe, Deputy Principal Librarian at the Public Library of New South Wales was the first honorary general secretary and drafted much of the original constitution.

The Association assumed the title of the Library Association of Australia in 1949, and in 1989 adopted the new name of the Australian Library and Information Association in recognition of the broadening scope of the profession.

The Archives section, which had existed between 1951 and 1973, became the Australian Society of Archivists in 1975.

Governance and description
The Association is governed by a constitution and is guided by its vision, mission, objects and values. Their policy statements are developed by an elected board of directors and implemented by the ALIA National Office.

ALIA National Office staff are based in ALIA House in the nation's capital, Canberra.

Membership and activities
Membership of ALIA is open to individuals and organisations alike: the only membership requirement is an interest in the sector. Members of ALIA can belong to as many groups as they wish. These groups actively participate in Association activities.

ALIA Awards, national and regional, are presented each year to reward members of the library and information community and to celebrate their achievements.

Publications

Journal of the Australian Library and Information Association (JALIA), a quarterly scholarly journal, named as of Volume 66, Issue 1, 2017; a merger of the Australian Library Journal (ALJ)  (1951 to 2016), and Australian Academic and Research Libraries (AARL) (1970 to 2016).
INCITE (also styled Incite, inCite and InCite), a news magazine for members, published six times a year , (formerly 12-20 times a year). It was first published in January 1980. Issues dating from  Volume 33, issue 1/2 (January/February 2012) are available via National edeposit, Issues from 1980 to 2016 are available as scanned electronic versions on AustLII, and many back issues (until 2020) are also on the Informit database. Since 2018, some whole issues of INCITE are produced in a freely available digital-only format each year, with one article from each print issue also freely available online, on the ALIA website.

Conferences 
ALIA hosts a number of conferences which are rotated around Australia:

 ALIA Information Online Conference
 ALIA National Conference
 ALIA New Librarians' Symposium
 ALIA National Library and Information Technicians' Symposium

See also
 Anne Clyde
 William Herbert Ifould
 Patricia Gallaher
 John Brudenall (librarian)

References

External links 

 
1937 establishments in Australia
Organizations established in 1937
Professional associations based in Australia